Maud Muir (born 12 July 2001) is an English rugby union player. In 2021 she was named as one of six development players included in the 2021 Women's Six Nations England squad and plays for Wasps Women at club level.

International career 
Muir has been a member of the England U20s and U18s sides. In 2021, she was named as part of the England squad for the 2021 Women's Six Nations Championships as one of six development players on the side.

She was a non-playing reserve in the opening two Six Nations games against Scotland and Italy. She was named in the England squad for the delayed 2021 Rugby World Cup held in New Zealand in October and November 2022.

Club career 
Muir joined Wasps Women in 2018. It is her first senior club side.

Early life and education 
Muir began playing rugby in Oxford. She joined the Oxford Harlequins (U6-U11) and then moved to the Gosford All Blacks, joining the U15 and later U18 sides.

She represented the South West at age grade level and moved to the Wasps' Centre of Excellence before joining the senior team.

She was awarded a Brunel Sports Scholarship, allowing her to train as a professional athlete while studying a sports science degree.

Muir is also a keen cricketer.

References 

2001 births
Living people
England women's international rugby union players
English female rugby union players
Rugby union players from Oxford